The Perfume of the Lady in Black is a 1974 giallo-horror film directed by Francesco Barilli. The film had nothing to do with the similarly-titled novel by Gaston Leroux.

Plot 
Silvia (Mimsy Farmer) is a successful manager at a chemical laboratory. With her boyfriend Roberto (Maurizio Bonuglia), she visits some African-Italian friends including Andy (Jho Jenkins). Andy explains that witchcraft, curses and human sacrifice are all commonplace in African cultures. Roberto claims there are human sacrificial groups all over the world, including in Europe.  Soon afterwards, Silvia begins to experience a series of hallucinations and memories. Some of the memories include Silvia's mother (Renata Zamengo) first sitting in a chair and putting on perfume in a black dress, and another memory of the mother having sex with a man that is not Silvia's father. Silvia's mother died by apparently jumping off a balcony when Silvia was younger. Intermixed with all of these visions are a strange series of events that seem to indicate Silvia's inability to know what is truly real: a vase from Silvia's past appearing in her apartment after vanishing from a local store, a bouquet of flowers dying quickly, and a little girl, portraying a younger Silvia.  

But as the film progresses, we begin to realize that everyone around Silvia seems to be conspiring together. This includes Roberto, Andy, and the doorman who all are seen driving off together. Long gazes from neighbors, coworkers, and store clerks all seem to fuel this paranoia. Silvia's visions and hallucinations become more frequent, she decides to employ the help of a blind clairvoyant. At this seance, the clairvoyant taps into Silvia's troubling past and sees her father drowning at sea and Silvia pushing her mother off the balcony. The clairvoyant also indicates her stepfather, who attempted to sexually molest Silvia, will pursue Silvia. We then see the Clairvoyant, Roberto, Andy and others meet in an abandoned tunnel and put on blue lab coats and disappear into the tunnel.

Silvia begins to confront visions of her young self who appears in her apartment and disappears when she brings over her neighbor. Shortly afterwards, Francesca, one Silvia's neighbor is found dead. After attending the funeral, Silvia comes home and finds Francesca's cremated remains have been left in her apartment. Another hallucination shows Silvia pushing her mother off a balcony and finding her mother's black dress and her neighbor's dead cat. While trying to get her neighbor's cat taxidermied, she sees her stepfather Nicola (Orazio Orlando) who wonders why she wrote down their old address. Fearful, Silvia runs away and goes to her old house. Nicola follows her there, corners her, and begins to rape her. Silvia finds a concrete slab and smashes his head, and runs away leaving him on the floor to die. Silvia brings back Roberto to see Nicola's body but nobody is there. 

Silvia's hallucinations increase as her younger self begins to command her to do things as she is wearing her mother's black dress. Silvia breaks into her neighbors apartment, and brutally murders him. Roberto comes over and Silvia also stabs him. She then arranges Roberto's body, with that of her neighbor and Nicola around a table. She then proceeds to go up to the roof where her younger self grabs her and they both fall off the roof. We see that only the dead body of older Silvia is on the pavement down below. 

Silvia's body is then seen in a dark chamber in the same abandoned tunnel system seen earlier in the movie. A large crowd of people dressed in blue lab coats stand around the body. We see that Roberto, Nicola and her neighbor are all alive and standing over Silvia's body. Roberto cuts into her body, and each member of the circle begins to grab for pieces of flesh from Silvia's body and immediately devours it. The last shots are of this group of people disappearing into the recesses of the tunnels with their pieces of flesh.

Cast 
 Mimsy Farmer: Silvia
 Maurizio Bonuglia: Roberto
 Mario Scaccia: Rossetti
 Jho Jenkins as Andy
 Nike Arrighi as Orchidea
 Orazio Orlando: Nicola
 Renata Zamengo: Silvia's Mother
 Carla Mancini: Elisabetta 
 Lara Wendel: Young Silvia
Donna Jordan: Francesca
 Aldo Valletti: Man of the Sect

Release
The Perfume of the Lady in Black was distributed theatrically in Italy by Euro International Film on 29 March 1974. On its domestic release, it grossed a total of 582,674,000 Italian lire.

See also
 List of Italian films of 1974

Footnotes

References

External links

1974 films
1970s crime thriller films
Giallo films
Films directed by Francesco Barilli
Films scored by Nicola Piovani
1970s Italian films